Protein kinase C, zeta (PKCζ), also known as PRKCZ, is a protein in humans that is encoded by the PRKCZ gene.  The PRKCZ gene encodes at least two alternative transcripts, the full-length PKCζ and an N-terminal truncated form PKMζ. PKMζ is thought to be responsible for maintaining long-term memories in the brain. The importance of PKCζ in the creation and maintenance of long-term potentiation was first described by Todd Sacktor and his colleagues at the SUNY Downstate Medical Center in 1993.

Structure
PKC-zeta has an N-terminal regulatory domain, followed by a hinge region and a C-terminal catalytic domain. Second messengers stimulate PKCs by binding to the regulatory domain, translocating the enzyme from cytosol to membrane, and producing a conformational change that removes auto-inhibition of the PKC catalytic protein kinase activity. PKM-zeta, a brain-specific isoform of PKC-zeta generated from an alternative transcript, lacks the regulatory region of full-length PKC-zeta and is therefore constitutively active.

PKMζ is the independent catalytic domain of PKCζ and, lacking an autoinhibitory regulatory domain of the full-length PKCζ, is constitutively and persistently active, without the need of a second messenger. It was originally thought of as being a cleavage product of full-length PKCζ, an atypical isoform of protein kinase C (PKC). Like other PKC isoforms, PKCζ is a serine/threonine kinase that adds phosphate groups to target proteins. It is atypical in that unlike other PKC isoforms, PKCζ does not require calcium or diacylglycerol (DAG) to become active, but rather relies on a different second messenger, presumably generated through a phosphoinositide 3-kinase (PI3-kinase) pathway.  It is now known that PKMζ is not the result of cleavage of full-length PKCζ, but rather, in the mammalian brain, is translated from its own brain-specific mRNA, that is transcribed by an internal promoter within the PKCζ gene. The promoter for full-length PKCζ is largely inactive in the forebrain and so PKMζ is the dominant form of ζ in the forebrain and the only PKM that is translated from its own mRNA.

Function

PKCζ 
Atypical PKC (aPKC) isoforms [zeta (this enzyme) and lambda/iota] play important roles in insulin-stimulated glucose transport. Human adipocytes contain PKC-zeta, rather than PKC-lambda/iota, as their major aPKC. Inhibition of the PKCζ enzyme inhibits insulin-stimulated glucose transport while activation of PKCζ increases glucose transport.

PKMζ 
PKMζ is thought to be responsible for maintaining the late phase of long-term potentiation (LTP). LTP is one of the major cellular mechanisms that are widely considered to underlie learning and memory. This theory arose from the observation that PKMζ perfused into neurons causes synaptic potentiation, and selective inhibitors of PKMζ like zeta inhibitory peptide (ZIP), when bath applied one hour after tetanization, inhibit the late phase or maintenance of LTP. Thus, PKMζ was thought to be both necessary and sufficient for maintaining LTP. Subsequent work showed that inhibiting PKMζ reversed LTP maintenance when applied up to 5 hours after LTP was induced in hippocampal slices, and after 22 hours in vivo. Inhibiting PKMζ in behaving animals erased spatial long-term memories in the hippocampus that were up to one month old, without affecting spatial short-term memories, and erased long-term memories for fear conditioning and inhibitory avoidance in the basolateral amygdala. When ZIP was injected into rats' sensorimotor cortices, it erased muscle memories for a task, even after several weeks of training. In the neocortex, thought to be the site of storage for most long-term memories, PKMζ inhibition erased associative memories for conditioned taste aversion in the insular cortex, up to 3 months after training. The protein also seems to be involved, through the nucleus accumbens, in the consolidation and reconsolidation of the memory related to drug addiction. Although results from PKCζ/PKMζ-null mice demonstrate LTP and memory appear largely the same as wild-type mice, the normal function of PKMζ in LTP and long-term memory storage was shown to be compensated by the other atypical PKC isoform, PKCι/λ in the knock-out.

Alteration in PKMζ may be involved in neurodegeneration Alzheimer's disease.

Model organisms
Model organisms have been used in the study of PRKCZ function. A conditional knockout mouse line, called Prkcztm1a(EUCOMM)Wtsi was generated as part of the International Knockout Mouse Consortium program – a high-throughput mutagenesis project to generate and distribute animal models of disease to interested scientists.

Male and female animals underwent a standardized phenotypic screen to determine the effects of deletion. Twenty five tests were carried out on mutant mice and three significant abnormalities were observed. Homozygous mutant males had Bergmeister's papilla, while both sexes had atypical plasma chemistry and abnormal melanocyte morphology.

Inhibitors
 1,3,5-Trisubstituted Pyrazolines

Interactions 

PRKCZ has been shown to interact with:

 AKT3, 
 C-Raf, 
 C1QBP, 
 CENTA1, 
 FEZ1, 
 FEZ2, 
 MAP2K5,
 NFATC2, 
 PARD6A, 
 PARD6B, 
 PAWR, 
 PDPK1, 
 RELA, 
 Src, 
 WWC1, 
 YWHAB, and
 YWHAQ,
 YWHAZ.

References

Further reading 

 
 

Genes mutated in mice
EC 2.7.11